Jacob Peter Huydecoper (11 November 1811 – 12 February 1845) was an early 19th-century Elmina Euro-African civil servant and diplomat on the Dutch Gold Coast.

Early life 
Jacob Huydecoper was born in Elmina to Willem Huydecoper and a Fante woman named Akosewa Kombati. He was a member of the prominent Afro-European Huydecoper family, which traces its ancestor to Jan Pieter Theodoor Huydecoper, a Director-General of the Dutch Gold Coast in the 18th century.

Career 
Huydecoper started his career in the colonial administration of the Dutch Gold Coast in July 1832, when he was installed as a provisional assistant at Elmina. He became a regular assistant on 15 December 1836.

Huydecoper was charged with the recruitment of the so-called Belanda Hitam, Gold Coastan and Akan recruitments for the Royal Netherlands East Indies Army, at the Ashanti capital of Kumasi, between 1838 and 1842. With this move, he followed in the footstep of his father, who also was the Dutch envoy at the Ashanti court between 1816 and 1817.

Death and legacy 
Huydecoper returned from Kumasi on 1 February 1842, and was honourably discharged of all his duties on 31 March 1842. Three years later, Huydecoper died in Elmina at the age of 33.

Huydecoper is considered the initiator of the Methodist mission in Elmina, established in 1842, after he himself was converted to Christianity by The Reverend Thomas Birch Freeman when the latter was stationed at Kumasi in 1839.

References

Footnotes

Bibliography 

 
 

1811 births
1845 deaths
Converts to Christianity
Dutch Gold Coast people
Dutch people of Ghanaian descent
Ghanaian people of Dutch descent
People from Elmina